Ant nest beetles (subfamily Paussinae) or paussines, some members of which are known also as flanged bombardier beetles, are a large subfamily within the ground beetles (Carabidae).The tribes Metriini, Ozaenini, Paussini and Protopaussini are included in the subfamily.

Rarely seen in the open, except at lights, most Paussinae are obligate or facultative myrmecophiles, living within the nests of ants, predatory on ant larvae and workers. Many have elaborate antennal structures and body parts flattened. Paussines are moderate sized (6–20 mm), characterised by glandular hairs that produce secretions attractive to ants and by the odd antennal structures of many species. Their pygidial glands can produce explosive secretions, with a spray of quinones that are directed forward by flanges at the posterior end of the elytra, giving them the other name of flanged bombardier beetles although they are not particularly close relatives of the typical bombardier beetles (Brachininae).

Biology
Very little is known about the immature stages of ant nest beetles. Most appear to live in ant nests in their early stages of life. Although many are facultative or obligate myrmecophiles, most do not appear like ants (i.e. myrmecomorphic) and unlike in the case of myrmecophilous larval Lycaenidae, there appears to be no benefit gained by the ants in this association.  Many species follow the trails of worker ants of specific species. Glandular secretions on their antennae and body allow them to interact with ant workers. It is believed that the beetles use an acoustic mechanism to successfully imitate the sounds of an ant queen thus permitting them access to the nest without alarming the ants. Worker ants groom the beetles. Adult Paussus favieri have been observed to antennate and interact by stridulation with the queen of Pheidole pallidula in the brood chamber. The defensive bombardier behaviour is never used against ants. Unlike bombardier beetles in the family Brachininae, which have two glands opening close together on the abdomen, the glands are located close to the lateral margins and lie under a flange formed by the tip of the elytra. The flange is curved and the explosive hot spray of quinones is directed forward by Coandă effect. The flange is not present in members of the tribe Metriini but is replaced by similar internal structures. Males of some species are attracted to lights during some parts of the season and are thought to disperse from one ant nest to another. Males are thought to be short-lived. These beetles feed on ant eggs, larvae and adults by piercing their mandibles into the abdomen or other soft part and sucking the contents. Apart from chemical mimicry and communication with their hosts, they also make use of vibrations. Several stridulatory structures are found in these beetles including alary-elytral, abdomen-femur and thorax-femur combinations of surfaces. Larvae of only about 10 species have ever been examined. The first instar larvae of Paussus favieri has a terminal disc which is raised at times and bent back over the head. They also exhibit some behaviours and mouth part adaptations which may be involved in eliciting trophallaxis by the ant hosts but this has not been confirmed. They opportunistically feed on the haemolymph of ant larvae.

Systematics
The subfamily Paussinae contains 54 genera, with over 800 species divided into the following tribes and subtribes:

While some tribes like Metriini and Ozaenini appear quite similar to typical carabids, others have modified antennae and body shapes. The Protopaussini and Paussini are slender or compact in body shape with enlarged antennae in the Paussini.

These 54 genera belong to the subfamily Paussinae:

Tribe Metriini LeConte, 1853
 Metrius Eschscholtz, 1829
 Sinometrius Wrase & J.Schmidt, 2006
 †Kryzhanovskiana Kataev & Kirejtshuk, 2019 Burmese amber, Myanmar, Cenomanian
Tribe Ozaenini Hope, 1838
 Subtribe Microzaenina Deuve, 2019
 Microzaena Fairmaire, 1901
 Subtribe Mystropomina G.Horn, 1881
 Mystropomus Chaudoir, 1848
 Subtribe Ozaenina Hope, 1838
 Crepidozaena Deuve, 2001
 Entomoantyx Ball & McCleve, 1990
 Filicerozaena Deuve, 2001
 Gibbozaena Deuve, 2001
 Goniotropis G.R.Gray, 1831
 Inflatozaena Deuve, 2001
 Mimozaena Deuve, 2001
 Ozaena Olivier, 1812
 Pachyteles Perty, 1830
 Physea Brullé, 1835
 Physeomorpha Ogueta, 1963
 Platycerozaena Bänninger, 1927
 Proozaena Deuve, 2001
 Serratozaena Deuve, 2001
 Tachypeles Deuve, 2001
 Tropopsis Solier, 1849
 Subtribe Pseudozaenina Sloane, 1905
 Anentmetus Andrewes, 1924
 Dhanya Andrewes, 1919
 Eustra Schmidt-Goebel, 1846
 Itamus Schmidt-Goebel, 1846
 Pseudozaena Laporte, 1834
 Sphaerostylus Chaudoir, 1848
Tribe Paussini Latreille, 1806
 Subtribe Carabidomemnina Wasmann, 1928
 Carabidomemnus Kolbe, 1924
 Eohomopterus Wasmann, 1919
 Subtribe Cerapterina Billberg, 1820
 Arthropterus W.S.MacLeay, 1838
 Cerapterus Swederus, 1788
 Megalopaussus Lea, 1906
 Mesarthropterus Wasmann, 1926
 Subtribe Heteropaussina Janssens, 1950
 Heteropaussus J.Thomson, 1860
 Subtribe Homopterina Wasmann, 1920
 Homopterus Westwood, 1841
 Subtribe Paussina Latreille, 1806
 Allorhopalus Nagel, 2017
 Ceratoderus Westwood, 1841
 Euplatyrhopalus Desneux, 1905
 Lebioderus Westwood, 1838
 Leleupaussus Luna de Carvalho, 1962
 Melanospilus Westwood, 1847
 Paussomorphus Raffray, 1885
 Paussus Linnaeus, 1775
 Platyrhopalides Wasmann, 1918
 Platyrhopalopsis Desneux, 1905
 Platyrhopalus Westwood, 1833
 Pterorhopalus Maruyama, 2011
 Subtribe Pentaplatarthrina Jeannel, 1946
 Hexaplatarthrus Jeannel, 1955
 Pentaplatarthrus Westwood, 1833
 Subtribe †Arthropteritina Luna de Carvalho, 1961
 †Arthropterites Wasmann, 1926
 †Cerapterites Wasmann, 1926
 †Protocerapterus Wasmann, 1926
 Subtribe †Eopaussina Luna de Carvalho, 1951
 †Eopaussus Wasmann, 1926
Tribe Protopaussini Gestro, 1892
 Protopaussus Gestro, 1892

References

Paussinae